Stjernen is the Norwegian word for star in the definite form.

Stjernen may also refer to:

Stjernen Hockey, an ice hockey club based in Fredrikstad, Norway.
Stjernen I, a former Norwegian Royal boat.
Stjernen (II), the present Norwegian Royal Boat.
Stjernen (newspaper), a Nebraskan newspaper